Destuntzia is a genus of truffle-like fungi in the family Gomphaceae. The genus contains five species found in North America. It is named after late American mycologist Daniel Elliot Stuntz.

References

External links

Gomphaceae
Agaricomycetes genera
Taxa named by James Trappe